Travel On, Rider is the fifth studio album by Columbus, Ohio-based rock band Scrawl. It was released in 1996 on Elektra Records, making it the band's major-label debut. It was produced by Steve Albini and Jeff Powell.

In a favorable review, Gina Arnold wrote that "although Travel On, Rider...is by far the best album of [Scrawl's] career, it is also the band's most difficult." She also described the album as "the Ladies to the [Afghan] Whigs' 1993 tour de force Gentlemen. Andy Kellman gave Travel On, Rider 3 and a half stars out of 5, writing, "Without sacrificing the band's rough edges, Steve Albini's and Jeff Powell's recording and engineering give the band it's [sic] most polished sound yet, but it doesn't make their songs -- still bitter, still pessimistic, still sad -- suffer for it."

Track listing
"Good Under Pressure" –	3:39
"The Garden Path" –	3:11
"I'm Not Stuck" –	4:23
"From Deep Inside Her" – 2:49
"Story Musgrave"	–       4:46
"Easy On Her Mind" –	2:46
"Hunting Me Down" –	2:27
"Louis L'Amour" –	3:12
"Come Back Then" –	2:49
"He Cleaned Up" –	3:09
"Story Musgrave (At The Piano)" –	3:39
"What Did We Give Away?" –	3:46

References

Albums produced by Steve Albini
1996 albums
Elektra Records albums
Scrawl albums